James A. McDonell  (born ) is a Canadian politician. He was a Progressive Conservative member of the Legislative Assembly of Ontario who represented the riding of Stormont—Dundas—South Glengarry. He has been an MPP from 2011 until his retirement in 2022. He was mayor of the township of South Glengarry, Ontario from 2003 to 2011.

Background
McDonell was born and raised on a dairy farm in South Glengarry, Ontario. He attended Queen's University where he earned a degree in engineering. He worked for Bell Canada for over 30 years in a number of roles. He and his wife Margie live in Williamstown, Ontario, where they raised their three children.

Politics
In 2000, McDonell was elected as a councillor for the township of South Glengarry. In 2003 he was elected as mayor of the township.

In the 2011 provincial election he ran as the Progressive Conservative candidate in the riding of Stormont—Dundas—South Glengarry. He defeated Liberal candidate Mark MacDonald by 13,050 votes. He was easily re-elected in the 2014 election.

He served as the party's critic for Government and Consumer Services during his first term and on his second term served as a Member on the Standing Committee on Public Accounts as well as a Parliamentary Assistant to the Minister of Municipal Affairs and Housing (Municipal Affairs).

He stood down at the 2022 Ontario general election. He was replaced in the provincial parliament by fellow PC nominee Nolan Quinn.

Electoral record

References

External links

1954 births
Living people
Mayors of places in Ontario
Progressive Conservative Party of Ontario MPPs
People from the United Counties of Stormont, Dundas and Glengarry
Canadian engineers
21st-century Canadian politicians